Paul Kletzki (born Paweł Klecki; 21 March 1900 – 5 March 1973) was a Polish conductor and composer.

Biography 

Born in Łódź, Kletzki joined the Łódź Philharmonic at the age of fifteen as a violinist. After serving in the First World War, he studied philosophy at the University of Warsaw before moving to Berlin in 1921 to continue his studies. During the 1920s his compositions were championed by Arturo Toscanini; and Wilhelm Furtwängler, who permitted Kletzki to conduct the Berlin Philharmonic in 1925. Because he was Jewish, he left Nazi Germany in 1933 and moved to Milan, Italy, where he taught composition. Due to the anti-semitism of the Italian Fascist regime he moved to the Soviet Union in 1936.

During the Holocaust a number of Kletzki's family were murdered by the Nazis including his parents and his sister. In 1946, he participated in the reopening of La Scala in Milan.

In 1949, he became a Swiss citizen.

In the post-war years Kletzki was a renowned conductor, especially of Gustav Mahler. In 1954 he was appointed chief conductor of the Liverpool Philharmonic Orchestra. In 1955, he conducted the first recordings of the Israel Philharmonic Orchestra. Between 1958 and 1961 he was principal conductor of the Dallas Symphony Orchestra. From 1967 until 1970 he was the General Music Director of the Orchestre de la Suisse Romande.

He died on 5 March 1973 at 72 years of age after collapsing during a rehearsal at the Liverpool Philharmonic Orchestra.

Work 

Most of Paul Kletzki's compositions were thought to be destroyed during World War II. However, during excavations in Milan in 1965, a chest was found containing the scores he had left in the basement of the Hotel Metropole in 1941. Kletzki, fearing his scores had turned to dust, did not open the chest. Upon his death in 1973 his wife, Yvonne, opened the chest finding his scores well-preserved.

Kletzki's most notable work is his Third Symphony, completed in October 1939, with the subtitle 'In memoriam'. It is an elegiac work interpreted as a moving monument to the victims of Nazism. Other works include three string quartets, a Sinfonietta for strings, a Fantasy for piano, and a sonata for violin and piano. From 1942 onwards Kletzki wrote no more compositions; he argued that Nazism had destroyed his spirit and his will to compose.

Compositions

References

External links

Kletzki biography at NAXOS.com
Discography
Wojciech Wendland: "The Three Musketeers from Łódź: Tansman, Tuwim and Kletzki", pp. 16–19, in: 9th International Festival and Competition of Musical Personalities – Tansman 2012 (in Polish and English), Tansman Philharmonic, Łódź

1900 births
1973 deaths
20th-century classical composers
20th-century conductors (music)
20th-century male musicians
Jewish classical composers
Jewish emigrants from Nazi Germany to Italy
Academic staff of Lausanne Conservatory
Male conductors (music)
Polish classical composers
Polish conductors (music)
Polish emigrants to Switzerland
Polish expatriates in Germany
Polish expatriates in Italy
Polish expatriates in Russia
20th-century Polish Jews
Polish male classical composers
Pupils of Heinrich Schenker
Texas classical music
Musicians from Łódź